Bilal Göregen (born 4 September 1988) is a Turkish street musician and drummer. He is blind and has become famous via his rendition of Ievan polkka, wherein a Twitter user superimposed a cat bobbing its head on his video.  YouTube has shared his performing video on Instagram.

Life and career 
Born and raised in Hatay, Turkey. Bilal Göregen has performed in O Ses Türkiye. He earned fame by Sevdiğim kız bana abi deyince. He had a video with the mayor of Istanbul Ekrem İmamoğlu. He is from Bitlis.

References 

Living people
1988 births
Turkish musicians
Turkish YouTubers
Blind musicians
Turkish blind people
People from Hatay Province